Magazine 60 was a French synthpop band founded by music producer, Jean-Luc Drion. Other members are Dominique Régiacorte,    
Pierre Mastro and Véronique Olivier. The group was best known for the 1984 song, "Don Quichotte", which hit the Top 10 in France and the Top 60 in the United States in 1986.

Biography
In 1981, the band released an EP, Magazine 60, by Barclay Records. It sold over 260,000 copies in France, making the Top Ten, and became a gold record. One of the original singers, Danielle Delval left the band that year and was replaced by Michele Callewart. In 1982, the band released their first album, 60's Slows, which sold over 280,000 copies and made Top Ten. The band then released two music videos internationally and went on tour.

After several more line-up changes, the band decided to take a new direction in the mid-1980s.  Pierre (Dit El Chico), Dominique, Véromique released the singles "Don Quichotte (No Están Aquí)" and "Rendez-vous sur la Costa del Sol," both of which appeared on the 1985 album that followed, Costa del Sol.  "Don Quichotte" became the band's most successful hit in the U.S.  However, the Costa del Sol album would not be released in America until 1987, by which point, the group had lost momentum there. The group made a few songs during the early 80s and 90s that were in Spanish like the song "Pancho villa" and "No sabe bailar"

By June 2013, the music of Don Quichotte tube (No están aquí) starring Dominique and Pierre resumed, this time in an advertising Sosh the mobile brand. A single entitled Don Quichotte – Edit TV comes in the wake still under the name Magazine 60. The title is also on the compilation Hit 2013 – Special September.
Pierre ex member of Magazine 60, began a solo career, taking his original titles Don Quichotte, Costa Del Sol, Pancho Villa and his creations in Mexico Come On, Dont Play Love, etc.

Discography

Albums
1981: Magazine 60 (album)
1985: Costa Del Sol (album)
2014: The Origin (album) (Pierre, ex member of Magazine 60, of 15 titles album by Pierre Mastro)

Singles
1982: "J'fais d'la Radio" 
1982: "Sir Walter Gimmick"
1984/85: "Don Quichotte (No Están Aquí)" (FR #10, US #56, AUT #25, NED #42)
1985: "Rendezvous sur la Costa del Sol"
1986: "Florida Mix"
1987: "Pancho Villa" (1987)
1988: "Tap Connection"
1989: "Seasonkonancluzo"

See also
Euro disco
Italo disco

References

External links
Discogs.com

French dance music groups
French new wave musical groups
Musical groups from Hauts-de-France